Jeremy William Bray (29 June 193031 May 2002) was a British Labour politician and a Member of Parliament for 31 years.

Early life and education
Bray was born in British Hong Kong, the son of Reverend Arthur Bray, a Methodist missionary. He spent his formative years in Foshan, until he and his family were evacuated by gunboat prior to the arrival of the Japanese army in 1941. Returning to Britain, he attended Eastnor Village School, Aberystwyth Grammar School, Kingswood School, Bath (1942–48) and Jesus College, Cambridge, where he graduated as a Wrangler in 1953. Staying on at Cambridge to conduct doctoral research in pure mathematics under the supervision of J. E. Littlewood, he spent a year abroad as a Choate Fellow at Harvard University in 1955–56.

Career
Bray's first job upon leaving Cambridge was as a technical officer at the Imperial Chemical Industries works in Wilton, Teesside, where he advised his superiors to invest in the purchase of the plant's first computer. In the 1970s his interests turned more firmly towards statistics and econometrics, and from 1971 to 1974 he was the co-director of a research programme on econometric methods at Queen Mary College and Imperial College, London. He also spent some time working as a research officer at the Department of Applied Economics at the University of Cambridge, collaborating with the future Nobel Laureate Professor Sir Richard Stone and Terry Barker on the Cambridge Growth Project.

Political career
Bray unsuccessfully contested Thirsk and Malton for Labour in 1959. He was first elected as MP for Middlesbrough West in a 1962 by-election. During Harold Wilson's second term in office Bray was parliamentary secretary at the Ministry of Power (1966–67) and Ministry of Technology (1967–69), serving under Richard Marsh and Tony Benn respectively. Middlesbrough West remained a highly marginal seat, however, and he was defeated in his attempt to be re-elected as an MP at the 1970 general election.

Following a four-year hiatus, Bray was then returned as MP for Motherwell and Wishaw from October 1974 to 1983, and for Motherwell South from 1983 until his retirement in 1997. Chosen by the Motherwell Labour Party as their candidate because of his steel industry expertise, during this second spell in parliament Bray was noted for his unflagging efforts to save the Ravenscraig steelworks from closure. He was the Opposition Spokesman on Science and Technology from 1983 to 1992.

Personal life
Bray married his wife Elizabeth in 1953 and had four daughters. A Methodist lay preacher, he was deputy chairman of Christian Aid from 1972 to 1984. His elder brother, Denis Bray, was a senior civil servant in colonial-era Hong Kong. 

Bray underwent major heart surgery in 1991, and afterwards was in increasingly poor health. He died of heart failure at his home in Linton, Cambridgeshire on 31 May 2002.

Notes

References
Times Guide to the House of Commons, Times Newspapers Limited, 1966, 1992 and 1997 editions
Obituary of Jeremy Bray, The Guardian

External links 

The Papers of Jeremy Bray held at Churchill Archives Centre, Cambridge

1930 births
2002 deaths
Labour Party (UK) MPs for English constituencies
Alumni of Jesus College, Cambridge
Harvard Fellows
Scottish Labour MPs
People educated at Kingswood School, Bath
UK MPs 1959–1964
UK MPs 1964–1966
UK MPs 1966–1970
UK MPs 1974–1979
UK MPs 1979–1983
UK MPs 1983–1987
UK MPs 1987–1992
UK MPs 1992–1997
Chairs of the Fabian Society
Ministers in the Wilson governments, 1964–1970